St Mary's Church is a redundant Church of England parish church in the civil parish of Chilton, Suffolk, England. It is a Grade I listed building, and is in the care of the Churches Conservation Trust.

To the north and east it is surrounded by farmland. To the south and west are the Sudbury eastern bypass and associated modern buildings on the outskirts of Sudbury.

History
The nave and chancel of the church are Perpendicular Gothic, built of flint in the 15th century. The south porch is also flint, but with brick quoins.

In the 16th century the Crane chapel north of the chancel and the west tower were added, and a Tudor window was inserted in the nave over the north doorway. All the 16th-century additions are built of brick.

The Crane chapel was built as a chantry chapel housing the table tombs of George Crane, who died in 1491, and Robert Crane, who died in 1500, and his wife. There is an alabaster recumbent effigy of George Crane on his tomb. After the Reformation the chapel continued as the Crane family mausoleum with the addition of the wall-mounted monument to Sir Robert Crane and his two wives. Sir Robert died in 1643 but he had the monument carved in 1626 by Gerard Christmas.

By the 1970s the small population of the parish of Chilton could no longer support the church. The Diocese of St Edmundsbury and Ipswich merged the benefice with that of St Gregory's Church, Sudbury and declared St Mary's redundant. In the 1980s the church building was vested in the care of the Churches Conservation Trust.

Architecture
The west tower has substantial brick angle buttresses. The tower and nave have flint battlements and the tower has crocketted pinnacles at the four corners. The Crane chapel is of two bays and its two northern corners have diagonal buttresses. The south porch has a moulded brick parapet.

See also
List of churches preserved by the Churches Conservation Trust in the East of England

References

Further reading

External links

15th-century church buildings in England
Church of England church buildings in Suffolk
Churches preserved by the Churches Conservation Trust
English Gothic architecture in Suffolk
Grade I listed churches in Suffolk
Babergh District